The Symphony No. 5 in C minor of Ludwig van Beethoven, Op. 67, was written between 1804 and 1808. It is one of the best-known compositions in classical music and one of the most frequently played symphonies, and it is widely considered one of the cornerstones of western music.  First performed in Vienna's Theater an der Wien in 1808, the work achieved its prodigious reputation soon afterward. E. T. A. Hoffmann described the symphony as "one of the most important works of the time". As is typical of symphonies during the Classical period, Beethoven's Fifth Symphony has four movements.

It begins with a distinctive four-note "short-short-short-long" motif:

The symphony, and the four-note opening motif in particular, are known worldwide, with the motif appearing frequently in popular culture, from disco versions to rock and roll covers, to uses in film and television.

Like Beethoven's Eroica (heroic) and Pastorale (rural), Symphony No. 5 was given an explicit name besides the numbering, though not by Beethoven himself. It became popular under "Schicksals-Sinfonie" (Fate Symphony), and the famous five bar theme was called the "Schicksals-Motiv" (Fate Motif). This name is also used in translations.

History

Development 

The Fifth Symphony had a long development process, as Beethoven worked out the musical ideas for the work. The first "sketches" (rough drafts of melodies and other musical ideas) date from 1804 following the completion of the Third Symphony.  Beethoven repeatedly interrupted his work on the Fifth to prepare other compositions, including the first version of Fidelio, the Appassionata piano sonata, the three Razumovsky string quartets, the Violin Concerto, the Fourth Piano Concerto, the Fourth Symphony, and the Mass in C. The final preparation of the Fifth Symphony, which took place in 1807–1808, was carried out in parallel with the Sixth Symphony, which premiered at the same concert.

Beethoven was in his mid-thirties during this time; his personal life was troubled by increasing deafness. In the world at large, the period was marked by the Napoleonic Wars, political turmoil in Austria, and the occupation of Vienna by Napoleon's troops in 1805. The symphony was written at his lodgings at the Pasqualati House in Vienna.

Premiere 

The Fifth Symphony premiered on 22 December 1808 at a mammoth concert at the Theater an der Wien in Vienna consisting entirely of Beethoven premieres, and directed by Beethoven himself on the conductor's podium. The concert lasted for more than four hours. The two symphonies appeared on the programme in reverse order: the Sixth was played first, and the Fifth appeared in the second half. The programme was as follows:
 The Sixth Symphony
 Aria: , Op. 65
 The Gloria movement of the Mass in C major
 The Fourth Piano Concerto (played by Beethoven himself)
 (Intermission)
 The Fifth Symphony
 The Sanctus and Benedictus movements of the C major Mass
 A solo piano improvisation played by Beethoven
 The Choral Fantasy

Beethoven dedicated the Fifth Symphony to two of his patrons, Prince Franz Joseph von Lobkowitz and Count Razumovsky. The dedication appeared in the first printed edition of April 1809.

Reception and influence 
There was little critical response to the premiere performance, which took place under adverse conditions. The orchestra did not play well—with only one rehearsal before the concert—and at one point, following a mistake by one of the performers in the Choral Fantasy, Beethoven had to stop the music and start again. The auditorium was extremely cold and the audience was exhausted by the length of the programme. However, a year and a half later, publication of the score resulted in a rapturous unsigned review (actually by music critic E. T. A. Hoffmann) in the Allgemeine musikalische Zeitung. He described the music with dramatic imagery:

Radiant beams shoot through this region's deep night, and we become aware of gigantic shadows which, rocking back and forth, close in on us and destroy everything within us except the pain of endless longing—a longing in which every pleasure that rose up in jubilant tones sinks and succumbs, and only through this pain, which, while consuming but not destroying love, hope, and joy, tries to burst our breasts with full-voiced harmonies of all the passions, we live on and are captivated beholders of the spirits.

Apart from the extravagant praise, Hoffmann devoted by far the largest part of his review to a detailed analysis of the symphony, in order to show his readers the devices Beethoven used to arouse particular affects in the listener. In an essay titled "Beethoven's Instrumental Music", compiled from this 1810 review and another one from 1813 on the op. 70 string trios, published in three installments in December 1813, E.T.A. Hoffmann further praised the "indescribably profound, magnificent symphony in C minor":
S
How this wonderful composition, in a climax that climbs on and on, leads the listener imperiously forward into the spirit world of the infinite!... No doubt the whole rushes like an ingenious rhapsody past many a man, but the soul of each thoughtful listener is assuredly stirred, deeply and intimately, by a feeling that is none other than that unutterable portentous longing, and until the final chord—indeed, even in the moments that follow it—he will be powerless to step out of that wondrous spirit realm where grief and joy embrace him in the form of sound....

The symphony soon acquired its status as a central item in the orchestral repertoire. It was played in the inaugural concerts of the New York Philharmonic on 7 December 1842, and the [US] National Symphony Orchestra on 2 November 1931. It was first recorded by the Odeon Orchestra under Friedrich Kark in 1910. The First Movement (as performed by the Philharmonia Orchestra) was featured on the Voyager Golden Record, a phonograph record containing a broad sample of the images, common sounds, languages, and music of Earth, sent into outer space aboard the Voyager probes in 1977. Groundbreaking in terms of both its technical and its emotional impact, the Fifth has had a large influence on composers and music critics, and inspired work by such composers as Brahms, Tchaikovsky (his 4th Symphony in particular), Bruckner, Mahler, and Berlioz.

Since the Second World War, it has sometimes been referred to as the "Victory Symphony". "V" is coincidentally also the Roman numeral character for the number five and the phrase "V for Victory" became a campaign of the Allies of World War II after Winston Churchill starting using it as a catchphrase in 1940. Beethoven's Victory Symphony happened to be his Fifth (or vice versa) although this is coincidental. Some thirty years after this piece was written, the rhythm of the opening phrase – "dit-dit-dit-dah" – was used for the letter "V" in Morse code, though this is also coincidental. During the Second World War, the BBC prefaced its broadcasts to Special Operations Executives (SOE) across the world with those four notes, played on drums. This was at the suggestion of intelligence agent Courtenay Edward Stevens.

Instrumentation 
The symphony is scored for the following orchestra:

Woodwinds

2 flutes
2 oboes

2 bassoons

Brass

2 trumpets in C

Percussion
timpani (in G–C)
Strings
violins I, II
violas
cellos
double basses

Form 
A typical performance usually lasts around 30–40 minutes. The work is in four movements:

I. Allegro con brio 

The first movement opens with the four-note motif discussed above, one of the most famous motifs in Western music. There is considerable debate among conductors as to the manner of playing the four opening bars. Some conductors take it in strict allegro tempo; others take the liberty of a weighty treatment, playing the motif in a much slower and more stately tempo; yet others take the motif molto ritardando. 

The first movement is in the traditional sonata form that Beethoven inherited from his Classical predecessors, such as Haydn and Mozart (in which the main ideas that are introduced in the first few pages undergo elaborate development through many keys, with a dramatic return to the opening section—the recapitulation—about three-quarters of the way through). It starts out with two dramatic fortissimo phrases, the famous motif, commanding the listener's attention. Following the first four bars, Beethoven uses imitations and sequences to expand the theme, these pithy imitations tumbling over each other with such rhythmic regularity that they appear to form a single, flowing melody. Shortly after, a very short fortissimo bridge, played by the horns, takes place before a second theme is introduced. This second theme is in E major, the relative major, and it is more lyrical, written piano and featuring the four-note motif in the string accompaniment. The codetta is again based on the four-note motif. The development section follows, including the bridge. During the recapitulation, there is a brief solo passage for oboe in quasi-improvisatory style, and the movement ends with a massive coda.

II. Andante con moto 

The second movement, in A major, the subdominant key of C minor's relative key (E major), is a lyrical work in double variation form, which means that two themes are presented and varied in alternation. Following the variations there is a long coda.

The movement opens with an announcement of its theme, a melody in unison by violas and cellos, with accompaniment by the double basses. A second theme soon follows, with a harmony provided by clarinets, bassoons, and violins, with a triplet arpeggio in the violas and bass. A variation of the first theme reasserts itself. This is followed up by a third theme, thirty-second notes in the violas and cellos with a counterphrase running in the flute, oboe, and bassoon. Following an interlude, the whole orchestra participates in a fortissimo, leading to a series of crescendos and a coda to close the movement.

III. Scherzo: Allegro 

The third movement is in ternary form, consisting of a scherzo and trio. While most symphonies before Beethoven's time employed a minuet and trio as their third movement, Beethoven chose to use the newer scherzo and trio form.

The movement returns to the opening key of C minor and begins with the following theme, played by the cellos and double basses:

The opening theme is answered by a contrasting theme played by the winds, and this sequence is repeated. Then the horns loudly announce the main theme of the movement, and the music proceeds from there. The trio section is in C major and is written in a contrapuntal texture. When the scherzo returns for the final time, it is performed by the strings pizzicato and very quietly. "The scherzo offers contrasts that are somewhat similar to those of the slow movement [Andante con moto] in that they derive from extreme difference in character between scherzo and trio ... The Scherzo then contrasts this figure with the famous 'motto' (3 + 1) from the first movement, which gradually takes command of the whole movement." The third movement is also notable for its transition to the fourth movement, widely considered one of the greatest musical transitions of all time.

IV. Allegro 

The fourth movement begins without pause from the transition. The music resounds in C major, an unusual choice by the composer as a symphony that begins in C minor is expected to finish in that key. In Beethoven's words: Many assert that every minor piece must end in the minor. Nego! ...Joy follows sorrow, sunshine—rain.

The triumphant and exhilarating finale is written in an unusual variant of sonata form: at the end of the development section, the music halts on a dominant cadence, played fortissimo, and the music continues after a pause with a quiet reprise of the "horn theme" of the scherzo movement. The recapitulation is then introduced by a crescendo coming out of the last bars of the interpolated scherzo section, just as the same music was introduced at the opening of the movement. The interruption of the finale with material from the third "dance" movement was pioneered by Haydn, who had done the same in his Symphony No. 46 in B, from 1772. It is unknown whether Beethoven was familiar with this work or not.

The Fifth Symphony finale includes a very long coda, in which the main themes of the movement are played in temporally compressed form. Towards the end the tempo is increased to presto. The symphony ends with 29 bars of C major chords, played fortissimo. In The Classical Style, Charles Rosen suggests that this ending reflects Beethoven's sense of proportions: the "unbelievably long" pure C major cadence is needed "to ground the extreme tension of [this] immense work."

Influences 
The 19th century musicologist Gustav Nottebohm first pointed out that the third movement's theme has the same sequence of intervals as the opening theme of the final movement of Mozart's famous Symphony No. 40 in G minor, K. 550. Here are the first eight notes of Mozart's theme:

While such resemblances sometimes occur by accident, this is unlikely to be so in the present case. Nottebohm discovered the resemblance when he examined a sketchbook used by Beethoven in composing the Fifth Symphony: here, 29 bars of Mozart's finale appear, copied out by Beethoven.

Lore 
Much has been written about the Fifth Symphony in books, scholarly articles, and program notes for live and recorded performances. This section summarizes some themes that commonly appear in this material.

Fate motif 
The initial motif of the symphony has sometimes been credited with symbolic significance as a representation of Fate knocking at the door. This idea comes from Beethoven's secretary and factotum Anton Schindler, who wrote, many years after Beethoven's death:

The composer himself provided the key to these depths when one day, in this author's presence, he pointed to the beginning of the first movement and expressed in these words the fundamental idea of his work: "Thus Fate knocks at the door!"

Schindler's testimony concerning any point of Beethoven's life is disparaged by many experts (Schindler is believed to have forged entries in Beethoven's so-called "conversation books", the books in which the deaf Beethoven got others to write their side of conversations with him). Moreover, it is often commented that Schindler offered a highly romanticized view of the composer.

There is another tale concerning the same motif; the version given here is from Antony Hopkins's description of the symphony. Carl Czerny (Beethoven's pupil, who premiered the "Emperor" Concerto in Vienna) claimed that "the little pattern of notes had come to [Beethoven] from a yellow-hammer's song, heard as he walked in the Prater-park in Vienna." Hopkins further remarks that "given the choice between a yellow-hammer and Fate-at-the-door, the public has preferred the more dramatic myth, though Czerny's account is too unlikely to have been invented."

In his Omnibus television lecture series in 1954, Leonard Bernstein likened the Fate Motif to the four note coda common to symphonies. These notes would terminate the symphony as a musical coda, but for Beethoven they become a motif repeating throughout the work for a very different and dramatic effect, he says.

Evaluations of these interpretations tend to be skeptical. "The popular legend that Beethoven intended this grand exordium of the symphony to suggest 'Fate Knocking at the gate' is apocryphal; Beethoven's pupil, Ferdinand Ries, was really author of this would-be poetic exegesis, which Beethoven received very sarcastically when Ries imparted it to him." Elizabeth Schwarm Glesner remarks that "Beethoven had been known to say nearly anything to relieve himself of questioning pests"; this might be taken to impugn both tales.

Beethoven's choice of key 
The key of the Fifth Symphony, C minor, is commonly regarded as a special key for Beethoven, specifically a "stormy, heroic tonality". Beethoven wrote a number of works in C minor whose character is broadly similar to that of the Fifth Symphony. Pianist and writer Charles Rosen says, Beethoven in C minor has come to symbolize his artistic character. In every case, it reveals Beethoven as Hero. C minor does not show Beethoven at his most subtle, but it does give him to us in his most extroverted form, where he seems to be most impatient of any compromise.

Repetition of the opening motif throughout the symphony 
It is commonly asserted that the opening four-note rhythmic motif (short-short-short-long; see above) is repeated throughout the symphony, unifying it. "It is a rhythmic pattern (dit-dit-dit-dot) that makes its appearance in each of the other three movements and thus contributes to the overall unity of the symphony" (Doug Briscoe); "a single motif that unifies the entire work" (Peter Gutmann); "the key motif of the entire symphony"; "the rhythm of the famous opening figure ... recurs at crucial points in later movements" (Richard Bratby). The New Grove encyclopedia cautiously endorses this view, reporting that "[t]he famous opening motif is to be heard in almost every bar of the first movement—and, allowing for modifications, in the other movements."

There are several passages in the symphony that have led to this view. For instance, in the third movement the horns play the following solo in which the short-short-short-long pattern occurs repeatedly:

In the second movement, an accompanying line plays a similar rhythm:

In the finale, Doug Briscoe suggests that the motif may be heard in the piccolo part, presumably meaning the following passage:

Later, in the coda of the finale, the bass instruments repeatedly play the following:

On the other hand, some commentators are unimpressed with these resemblances and consider them to be accidental. Antony Hopkins, discussing the theme in the scherzo, says "no musician with an ounce of feeling could confuse [the two rhythms]", explaining that the scherzo rhythm begins on a strong musical beat whereas the first-movement theme begins on a weak one. Donald Tovey pours scorn on the idea that a rhythmic motif unifies the symphony: "This profound discovery was supposed to reveal an unsuspected unity in the work, but it does not seem to have been carried far enough." Applied consistently, he continues, the same approach would lead to the conclusion that many other works by Beethoven are also "unified" with this symphony, as the motif appears in the "Appassionata" piano sonata, the Fourth Piano Concerto, and in the String Quartet, Op. 74. Tovey concludes, "the simple truth is that Beethoven could not do without just such purely rhythmic figures at this stage of his art."

To Tovey's objection can be added the prominence of the short-short-short-long rhythmic figure in earlier works by Beethoven's older Classical contemporaries such as Haydn and Mozart. To give just two examples, it is found in Haydn's "Miracle" Symphony, No. 96 and in Mozart's Piano Concerto No. 25, K. 503. Such examples show that "short-short-short-long" rhythms were a regular part of the musical language of the composers of Beethoven's day.

It seems likely that whether or not Beethoven deliberately, or unconsciously, wove a single rhythmic motif through the Fifth Symphony will (in Hopkins's words) "remain eternally open to debate".

Use of La Folia 

Folia is a dance form with a distinctive rhythm and harmony, which was used by many composers from the Renaissance well into the 19th and even 20th centuries, often in the context of a theme and variations. It was used by Beethoven in his Fifth Symphony in the harmony midway through the slow movement (bars 166–177). Although some recent sources mention that the fragment of the Folia theme in Beethoven's symphony was detected only in the 1990s, Reed J. Hoyt analyzed some Folia-aspects in the oeuvre of Beethoven already in 1982 in his "Letter to the Editor", in the journal College Music Symposium 21, where he draws attention to the existence of complex archetypal patterns and their relationship.

New Instrumentation 

The last movement of Beethoven's Fifth is the first time the piccolo, and contrabassoon were used in a symphony. While this was Beethoven's first use of the trombone in a symphony, in 1807 the Swedish composer Joachim Nicolas Eggert had specified trombones for his Symphony No. 3 in E major.

Textual questions

Third movement repeat 
In the autograph score (that is, the original version from Beethoven's hand), the third movement contains a repeat mark: when the scherzo and trio sections have both been played through, the performers are directed to return to the very beginning and play these two sections again. Then comes a third rendering of the scherzo, this time notated differently for pizzicato strings and transitioning directly to the finale (see description above). Most modern printed editions of the score do not render this repeat mark; and indeed most performances of the symphony render the movement as ABA' (where A = scherzo, B = trio, and A' = modified scherzo), in contrast to the ABABA' of the autograph score. The repeat mark in the autograph is unlikely to be simply an error on the composer's part. The ABABA' scheme for scherzi appears elsewhere in Beethoven, in the Bagatelle for solo piano, Op. 33, No. 7 (1802), and in the Fourth, Sixth, and Seventh Symphonies. However, it is possible that for the Fifth Symphony, Beethoven originally preferred ABABA', but changed his mind in the course of publication in favor of ABA'.

Since Beethoven's day, published editions of the symphony have always printed ABA'. However, in 1978 an edition specifying ABABA' was prepared by Peter Gülke and published by Peters. In 1999, yet another edition, by Jonathan Del Mar, was published by Bärenreiter which advocates a return to ABA'. In the accompanying book of commentary, Del Mar defends in depth the view that ABA' represents Beethoven's final intention; in other words, that conventional wisdom was right all along.

In concert performances, ABA' prevailed until the 2000s. However, since the appearance of the Gülke edition, conductors have felt more free to exercise their own choice. Performances with ABABA' seem to be particularly favored by conductors who specialize in authentic performance or historically informed performance (that is, using instruments of the kind employed in Beethoven's day and playing techniques of the period). These include Caroline Brown, Christopher Hogwood, John Eliot Gardiner, and Nikolaus Harnoncourt. ABABA' performances on modern instruments have also been recorded by the New Philharmonia Orchestra under Pierre Boulez, the Tonhalle Orchester Zürich under David Zinman, and the Berlin Philharmonic under Claudio Abbado.

Reassigning bassoon notes to the horns 
In the first movement, the passage that introduces the second subject of the exposition is assigned by Beethoven as a solo to the pair of horns.

At this location, the theme is played in the key of E major. When the same theme is repeated later on in the recapitulation section, it is given in the key of C major. Antony Hopkins writes:

In fact, even before Hopkins wrote this passage (1981), some conductors had experimented with preserving Beethoven's original scoring for bassoons. This can be heard on many performances including those conducted by Caroline Brown mentioned in the preceding section as well as in 2003 recording by Simon Rattle with the Vienna Philharmonic. Although horns capable of playing the passage in C major were developed not long after the premiere of the Fifth Symphony (they were developed in 1814), it is not known whether Beethoven would have wanted to substitute modern horns, or keep the bassoons, in the crucial passage.

Editions 
 The edition by Jonathan Del Mar mentioned above was published as follows: Ludwig van Beethoven. Symphonies 1–9. Urtext. Kassel: Bärenreiter, 1996–2000, ISMN M-006-50054-3.
 An inexpensive version of the score has been issued by Dover Publications. This is a 1989 reprint of an old edition (Braunschweig: Henry Litolff, no date).

Cover versions and other uses in popular culture 
The Fifth has been adapted many times to other genres, including the following examples:
 Franz Liszt arranged it for a piano solo in his Symphonies de Beethoven, S. 464.
 Electric Light Orchestra's version of "Roll Over Beethoven" incorporates the motif and elements from the first movement into a classic rock and roll song by Chuck Berry.
 Fantasia 2000 features a three-minute version of the first movement as its first segment.
 An adaptation appears as the theme music for the TV show Judge Judy since its 9th season in 2004.
 A disco arrangement appears as "A Fifth of Beethoven" by Walter Murphy on the soundtrack to the 1977 dance film Saturday Night Fever.
 The Brazilian telenovela Quanto Mais Vida, Melhor!  presents a varied version of the composition in the opening theme, exploring different rhythms such as samba, classical music, pop and rock.

See also 
 Symphony No. 5 (Beethoven)

Notes and references

Further reading 
 Carse, Adam (July 1948). "The Sources of Beethoven's Fifth Symphony." Music & Letters, vol. 29, no. 3, pp. 249–262.
 
 Knapp, Raymond (Summer 2000). "A Tale of Two Symphonies: Converging Narratives of Divine Reconciliation in Beethoven's Fifth and Sixth." Journal of the American Musicological Society, vol. 53, no. 2, pp. 291–343.

External links 

 Beethoven's Symphony No. 5 – A Beginners' Guide – Overview, analysis and the best recordings – The Classic Review
 General discussion and reviews of recordings
 Brief structural analysis
 Analysis of the Beethoven 5th Symphony, The Symphony of Destiny  on the All About Ludwig van Beethoven  Page
 Program notes for a performance by the National Symphony Orchestra, Washington, DC.
 Project Gutenberg has two MIDI-versions of Beethoven's 5th symphony: Etext No. 117 and Etext No. 156
 Program notes for a performance & lecture by Jeffrey Kahane and the Los Angeles Chamber Orchestra.
 Sketch to the Scherzo from op. 67 Fifth Symphony from Eroica Skbk (1803) – Unheard Beethoven Website
 Original Finale in c minor to Fifth Symphony op. 67, Gardi 23 (1804) – Unheard Beethoven Website
 Symphony No. 5 played by British Symphony Orchestra, Felix Weingartner (rec. 1932)
 Symphony No. 5 played by NBC Symphony Orchestra, Arturo Toscanini (rec. 1939)
 Symphony No. 5 played by Berliner Philharmoniker, Wilhelm Furtwängler (rec. 1947)

Scores 
 
 Mutopia project has a piano reduction score of Beethoven's 5th Symphony
 Public domain sheet music both typset and scanned on Cantorion.org
 Full Score of Beethoven's Fifth Symphony from Indiana University

1808 compositions
05
Compositions in C minor
Music dedicated to benefactors or patrons
Music dedicated to nobility or royalty
Contents of the Voyager Golden Record